Jonathan Powell (born 1969) is a British pianist and self-taught composer.

Biography 
Powell studied with Denis Matthews and Sulamita Aronovsky. He made his performing debut at the age of 20 in the Purcell Room in London.

His repertoire ranges from Bach to contemporary works, including composers as varied as Michael Finnissy, John White, Marco Ambrosini, Johannes Maria Staud and Christophe Sirodeau. He specialises in the works of the late Romantic era, including Russian music and Alexander Scriabin, on whose impact on Russian composers he wrote a dissertation at Cambridge University. Powell also contributed several articles to the second edition of The New Grove Dictionary of Music and Musicians, including the one on Scriabin, and has published articles on various Soviet and Russian composers.

Powell is best known for his advocacy of Sorabji's music, which he began performing regularly in the early 2000s. He has given 10 public performances of Sorabji's four-hour Opus clavicembalisticum (1929–30) and both performed and premiered other works by Sorabji, including the substantial Fourth Piano Sonata (1928–29) and the four-and-a-half-hour Piano Symphony No. 6, Symphonia claviensis (1975–76). Most notably, in 2020, he released the premiere recording of Sorabji's eight-hour Sequentia cyclica super "Dies irae" ex Missa pro defunctis (1948–49), which was met with considerable critical acclaim and was recognised by the Preis der deutschen Schallplattenkritik (German Record Critics' Award) as the best piano recording in its "Quarterly Critics' Choice" for the second quarter of 2020. Music writer Jed Distler said that Powell's performance has "a level of specificity and tonal application that gives new meaning to the word 'painstaking and makes "a compelling and standard-setting case for SC that will be hard to equal, let alone surpass", and composer Christian B. Carey wrote that "Powell's dedicated work on behalf of Sorabji makes the composer's legacy seem assured."

Powell's discography includes CDs for the Altarus, Largo, Toccata, ASV, Danacord and Piano Classics labels, featuring works by Alexander Goldenweiser, Joseph Marx, Alexander Krein, Konstantin Eiges, and others.

References

Sources 
 Roberge, Marc-André (2019). Opus sorabjianum: The Life and Works of Kaikhosru Shapurji Sorabji (free download of the book in PDF format from its presentation page on the Sorabji Resource Site). Retrieved 22 October 2019.

External links 
 Jonathan Powell's home page
 Powell's Violin Sonata (2010) given its premiere by the composer and its dedicatee Sonia Suldina (violin) at the 2010 Indian Summer in Levoca Festival (YouTube)
 Sonata No. 1 by Arnold Bax played by Powell (YouTube)
 Little Suite and Passacaglia by Eugen Suchoň played by Powell (YouTube)
 Etudes-Tableaux Op. 33 No. 1 by Sergei Rachmaninoff played by Powell (YouTube)
 Symphony for Piano Solo, 3rd movement (Menuet) by Charles-Valentin Alkan played by Powell (YouTube)

1969 births
Alumni of King's College, Cambridge
British classical musicians
British classical pianists
Male classical pianists
British composers
Living people
People educated at Eton College
People educated at Magdalen College School, Oxford